Capparis tonkinensis is a species of climbing shrub in the family Capparaceae.  The recorded distribution is restricted to Viet Nam where it may be called cáp bắc bộ.  No subspecies are listed in the Catalogue of Life.

References 

tonkinensis
Flora of Indo-China
Taxa named by François Gagnepain